The Pachmarhi Telescope Array or Pachmarhi Array of Cerenkov Telescopes (PACT) is an array of 24 telescopes for gamma-ray astronomy. It is located at Pachmarhi in Madhya Pradesh, India. It is operated by the Tata Institute of Fundamental Research.

Location
The Pachmarhi telescope array stands at Pachmarhi, Madhya Pradesh, India. It is located at an altitude of 1,075 m (3,527 ft).

History
The array was established in 1986.

Telescope
The Pachmarhi Array of Cerenkov Telescope is set in an area 80 meter by 100 meter in 5x5 matrix. Each telescope consists of 7 parabolic mirrors each with a diameter of 90 cm. Each telescope is independently steerable on its equatorial mount. It uses the wavefront sampling technique to detect TeV gamma rays.

See also
 Lists of telescopes

References

Astronomical observatories in India
Buildings and structures in Madhya Pradesh
Pachmarhi